Mubin Shaikh is a former security intelligence and counter terrorism operative, currently a Professor of Public Safety at Seneca College and also Counter Extremism Specialist for the U.S.-based NGO, Parents for Peace.

He rose to prominence in his role as a confidential human source in the Toronto 18 case.

He has testified as an expert for the United Nations Security Council, the United States Senate Committee on Homeland Security and Governmental Affairs with NATO, the National Counterterrorism Center, and Special Operations Command Central and he is an external expert with the Joint Staff SMA for CENTCOM Command Staff.

He has also appeared on media outlets such as CNN, CBC, ABC, and NBC MSNBC, on matters related to extremism and terrorism.

Career
Shaikh's operational experience originates with his role as an undercover counter-terrorism operative for the Canadian Security Intelligence Service (CSIS) in the 2006 Toronto terrorism case. He was active with CSIS for some years domestically, but the details of his activities are subject to national security restrictions and so cannot be disclosed to the public. Shaikh moved on to become a Royal Canadian Mounted Police agent with the Integrated National Security Enforcement Teams when one of the Service investigations uncovered a group of young Muslim men, of various ethnic backgrounds, intending to engage in criminal offences regarding terrorism.

It is clear from court evidence that the plot was well underway before CSIS had assigned Shaikh to the investigation. The investigation was formally moved from CSIS to the RCMP after Shaikh had verified the information that had been disclosed to him by the subjects of the investigation. After several public hearings (youth preliminary hearings in January 2007, adult preliminary hearings in September 2007, youth trial by judge in 2008, an "Abuse of Process" motion 2009, and a final Jury Trial of 3 remaining accused in 2010) and despite allegations of entrapment, Judge John Sproat, in March 2009, dismissed claims of entrapment and wrote in his ruling that Shaikh was cleared of any wrongdoing and "displayed a great number of the hallmarks of a truthful and credible witness," and that the group's plans were already underway prior to Shaikh's involvement and so could not have been the result of the state abusing its authority.

In total, seven people had charges "stayed" because of the sympathetic testimony of Shaikh. A prosecutor in the case even accused Shaikh of lying to protect the youth accused. The judge, in his ruling, once again sided with Shaikh. At the end of the adult trial by jury of the remaining three persons in June 2010, after several others had pleaded guilty, a comprehensive presentation of previously-restricted information including court exhibits entered as evidence, complete with transcripts and video, was put forward by Isabel Teotonio of the Toronto Star. Zakaria Amara wrote a letter of apology and Faheem Ahmad gave an interview on his radicalization.

In 2012, with the rise of ISIS, Shaikh was extensively involved in countering ISIS ideology and has presented at numerous conferences as an expert, on his efforts. He has trained military forces directly engaged in the fight against ISIS, including being a regular guest speaker with Defense Intelligence Agency as well at the United States Air Force Special Operations School. Shaikh is also part of the instructor cadre of Reticle Ventures, made up of former members and leaders of Joint Task Force 2 and other police and security agencies and services.

In connection to his work on the ISIS Returnee file, Shaikh also had discussions with Abu Huzaifa al-Kanadi who was charged in September 2020 with terrorism hoax, in relation to his claims about having been an ISIS executioner in Syria.

Shaikh is a co-author of the book Undercover Jihadi  and recognized for his work and life in a permanent exhibit in the International Spy Museum in Washington, D.C.

Education
Shaikh has a Master of Policing, Intelligence, and Counter-Terrorism from Macquarie University, Australia.

Personal life
Shaikh was born at St. Michael's Hospital in Toronto.  He attended Quran school as a child as well as public school. At age 14, he joined the Royal Canadian Army Cadets attaining the rank of Cadet Warrant Officer.

After an identity crisis because of a house party he went to Pakistan, where a chance encounter with the Taliban propelled him into extremism. The 9/11 attacks made him reconsider his views and he then spent 2 years in Syria augmenting previous private study of Islamic Studies where he went through a period of deradicalization, rejecting extremism and terrorism as anathema to Islam. He then returned to Canada and began his national security operations work.

References

External links 

 https://web.archive.org/web/20181006004104/http://www3.thestar.com/static/toronto18/index.html

1975 births
Living people
2006 Ontario terrorism plot
People in counterterrorism
People from Toronto
Sunni Sufis
Canadian Sufis
Canadian Sunni Muslims
Academic staff of Seneca College